There are number of spa towns in Hungary. Between the oldest and most visited are the spas of Budapest, Hévíz, Hajdúszoboszló, Bükfürdő, Sárvár and Zalakaros. In 2011 the Hungarian spas were visited by around 700,000 guests, of whom around half were foreigners, mainly from Austria, Germany and Russia.

List 

The following is a list of spa towns in Hungary.

Budapest:
 Gellért Baths
 Király Baths
 Rác Thermal Bath
 Rudas Baths
 Széchenyi thermal bath
Győr-Moson-Sopron County:
 Balf
 Hegykő
 Kapuvár
 Lipót
 Mosonmagyaróvár
Vas County:
 Bük (Bükfürdő)
 Körmend
 Sárvár
 Szombathely
Zala County:
 Alsópáhok
 Hévíz
 Kehidakustány
 Keszthely
 Zalakaros
Komárom-Esztergom County:
 Esztergom
 Komárom
 Tata
Veszprém County:
 Balatonfüred
 Pápa
 Tapolca
Somogy County:
 Nagyatád
Tolna County:
 Tamási
Baranya County:
 Harkány
 Szigetvár
Bács-Kiskun County:
 Kiskunhalas
 Kunszentmiklós
 Tiszakécske
 Lakitelek (Tőserdő)
Csongrád County:
 Algyő
 Csongrád
 Szeged (Kiskundorozsma)
 Makó
 Mórahalom
 Szentes
Békés County:
 Gyomaendrőd
 Orosháza (Gyopárosfürdő)
 Gyula
 Szarvas
Jász-Nagykun-Szolnok County:
 Berekfürdő
 Cserkeszőlő
 Jászapáti
 Kisújszállás
 Martfű
 Mezőtúr
 Tiszaörs
 Túrkeve
Hajdú-Bihar County:
 Balmazújváros
 Debrecen
 Hajdúböszörmény
 Hajdúszoboszló
Szabolcs-Szatmár-Bereg County:
 Fehérgyarmat
 Kisvárda
 Nyíregyháza (Sóstóhegy)
 Vásárosnamény
Borsod-Abaúj-Zemplén County:
 Bogács
 Mezőkövesd (Zsóry Bath)
 Miskolc (Miskolctapolca)
 Tiszaújváros
Heves County:
 Bükkszék
 Egerszalók
 Mátraderecske
 Parád (Parádfürdő)

Statistics

Most visitors staying in Hungary on short term basis (not counting visitors staying outside commercial accommodation and day trip visitors) are from the following countries of nationality:

Total tourist traffic

Domestic tourist traffic

Foreign tourist traffic

See also 
Tourism in Hungary
List of spa towns

Notes and references
Notes:

References:

External links 
 Official site of spa towns of Hungary
 Bath search in Hungary in Hungarian

 
Spa towns
Hungary